Carol Boyd Hallett (born October 16, 1937) is an American politician and government official who served in the California State Assembly from the 29th district from 1976 to 1982 and as the United States Ambassador to the Bahamas from 1986 to 1989. She also served as Commissioner of the United States Customs Service from 1989 to 1993. In 1995 she was named the first female President and CEO of the Air Transport Association, now known as Airlines for America.

References

External links

Carol Hallett - JoinCalifornia

1937 births
Living people
Republican Party members of the California State Assembly
Ambassadors of the United States to the Bahamas
Commissioners of the United States Customs Service
Politicians from Oakland, California
Women state legislators in California
21st-century American women